Laurie Daniel Hawn PC CD (born May 11, 1947, in Winnipeg, Manitoba) is a retired Lieutenant Colonel of the Royal Canadian Air Force, businessman, and former federal politician from Edmonton, Alberta. He was the Member of Parliament for Edmonton Centre from 2006 until 2015. He served as Parliamentary Secretary to the Minister of National Defence from October 10, 2007, until May 24, 2011.

Hawn announced in March 2014 that he was not running for re-election.

Early life and career 
Hawn joined the Royal Canadian Air Force in 1964 and received his pilot wings at Gimli, Manitoba in January 1967. He flew the Canadair T-33 Silver Star as an instructor pilot and as a tactical fighter pilot and instructor on the Canadair CF-104 Starfighter and was among the first Canadian military pilots to fly the McDonnell Douglas CF-18 Hornet fighters. In thirty years in the Air Force, Hawn rose to the rank of lieutenant-colonel and he then served an additional five years as honorary colonel of 417 Combat Support Squadron. Hawn commanded a Hornet equipped tactical fighter squadron at CFB Cold Lake.

When he retired in 1994 Hawn entered the financial services business where he opened and managed branch offices. Hawn is a founding member of the Investment Advisors Association of Canada.

Hawn is married; they have two children, and two grandchildren.

Member of Parliament
In January 2004 Hawn stood for election as a Member of Parliament in the constituency of Edmonton Centre.  His opponent in the 2004 election was the sitting Member of Parliament and Deputy Prime Minister, Anne McLellan, but Hawn failed to get elected by a few hundred votes. He continued to campaign and maintain an interest in politics in the 2006 election he stood again against McLellan. On January 23, 2006, he was elected as the representative of Edmonton Centre.

Hawn was appointed to the standing committee on National Defence, as well as the committee on Public Safety and National Security. In October 2007 Hawn was appointed the Parliamentary Secretary to the Minister of National Defence, Peter MacKay. In the Canadian parliamentary system, Parliamentary Secretaries act as a liaison between the government and House of Commons.  Laurie Hawn was a Canadian representative and a co-chair of the Permanent Canada-United States Joint Board of Defence as of 2012. Also, Hawn sat on the Treasury Board sub-committee on the Strategic and Operating Review.

Hawn has also won subsequent elections for Edmonton Centre in 2008 and 2011.

Hawn chose not to run for re-election in the 2015 Federal Election.

In January 2016, Laurie Hawn was appointed to the Edmonton Police Commission.

Honours
On October 1, 2010, Hawn was appointed to the Queen's Privy Council for Canada in recognition of "many years of dedication and hard work in the House of Commons, including on Canada’s engagement in Afghanistan".

For his military service he received the Canadian Forces Decoration with 2 Bars.

Electoral record

References

External links
 Official site
 
 HowdTheyVote - Laurie Hawn's voting record

1947 births
Businesspeople from Winnipeg
Canadian Air Force personnel
Canadian aviators
Conservative Party of Canada MPs
Living people
Members of the House of Commons of Canada from Alberta
Members of the King's Privy Council for Canada
Politicians from Winnipeg
Royal Canadian Air Force officers
21st-century Canadian politicians